Daniel Greaney is an American television writer. He has written for The Simpsons and The Office. He was hired during The Simpsons seventh season after writing the first draft of the episode "King-Size Homer", but left after season eleven. He returned to the Simpsons staff during the thirteenth season.

Life and career
Greaney attended Harvard College, where he was president of Harvard Lampoon and editor of the Harvard Lampoon's nationally distributed parody of USA Today.  He also worked as an editorial assistant at The Boston Globe. At Harvard Law School, he edited a student publication, competing against a rival publication edited by Barack Obama. He graduated from Harvard in 1987.

After college, he worked as a reporter for USA Today and co-authored a book entitled Truly One Nation with USA Today founder Allen H. Neuharth.  He subsequently attended Harvard Law School and practiced law in New York for two years, during which time he co-founded PME, a television and media company operating in Ukraine and several other former Soviet republics.

Greaney coined the word embiggen in 1996 for "Lisa the Iconoclast," an episode from season seven of The Simpsons.

Greaney has worked on numerous film projects, most notably as composer on Borat: Cultural Learnings of America for Make Benefit Glorious Nation of Kazakhstan.

Greaney is credited with writing "Bart to the Future", an episode of The Simpsons from 2000 that presented the possibility of a Donald Trump presidency, which would be realized sixteen years later.

Writing credits

The Simpsons episodes
Greaney has written the following episodes:

"King-Size Homer" (1995)
"Summer of 4 Ft. 2" (1996) 
"Treehouse of Horror VII" (The Genesis Tub) (1996)
"My Sister, My Sitter" (1997)
"The Simpsons Spin-Off Showcase" (The Love-Matic Grampa) (1997)
"Realty Bites" (1997)
"This Little Wiggy" (1998)
"I'm with Cupid" (1999)
"Thirty Minutes over Tokyo" (1999)
"Bart to the Future" (2000)
'Scuse Me While I Miss the Sky" (co-writer) (2003)
"I, (Annoyed Grunt)-bot" (co-writer) (2004)
"Bonfire of the Manatees" (2005)
"Judge Me Tender" (co-writer) (2010)
"Diggs" (co-writer) (2014)
"Barthood" (2015)
"The Great Phatsby" (Part 2 with Matt Selman) (2017)
"Now Museum, Now You Don't" (2020)
"Lisa the Boy Scout" (2022)

The Office episodes
Greaney wrote the following episodes:

"Mrs. California" (8.09) (2011)
"Suit Warehouse" (9.11) (2013)

Television pilots and series 
Greaney worked on the following pilots and short-lived TV series in his two-year break from The Simpsons:

The Michael Richards Show - Producer
Animals Anonymous - Creator, writer
Long Distance - Creator, writer

References

External links

Living people
American television writers
American male television writers
Year of birth missing (living people)
The Harvard Lampoon alumni
Harvard Law School alumni
Harvard College alumni
20th-century American screenwriters
20th-century American male writers
21st-century American screenwriters
21st-century American male writers